The Roman Catholic Diocese of Corneto had its see in Corneto, an old name for Tarquinia. It was absorbed by the Roman Catholic Diocese of Civitavecchia-Tarquinia

See also 
Roman Catholic Diocese of Montefiascone
Roman Catholic Diocese of Civitavecchia-Tarquinia
Tarquinia Cathedral
Catholic Church in Italy

References 

Former Roman Catholic dioceses in Italy